Francisco 'Chico' Augusto Neto Ramos (born 10 April 1995) is a Portuguese professional footballer who plays for Radomiak Radom as a midfielder.

Club career

Porto
Born in Póvoa de Varzim, Ramos joined FC Porto's youth system at the age of 13, from local Varzim SC. He made his senior debut with the former's B team, going on to spend several seasons with them in the Segunda Liga.

Ramos' maiden appearance with the main squad took place on 20 January 2016, in a 1–0 away loss against F.C. Famalicão in the group stage of the Taça da Liga. His first game in the Primeira Liga occurred on 12 March, as he came as an 88th-minute substitute for Vincent Aboubakar in a 3–2 home win over C.F. União.

Ramos was supposed to join G.D. Chaves on loan for the 2016–17 campaign. Following a left-foot injury contracted during the Summer Olympics, however, the move was aborted.

V. Guimarães
On 30 June 2017, Ramos signed a contract with fellow league club Vitória de Guimarães. He spent the better part of the following two seasons on loan to C.D. Santa Clara, also of the Portuguese top division.

Nacional
On 28 September 2020, Ramos signed a three-year deal with C.D. Nacional. The following 30 January, he scored his first top-flight goal to decide a 2–1 home victory over F.C. Famalicão; the season ended in relegation.

Radomiak
On 12 January 2023, Ramos joined Polish Ekstraklasa side Radomiak Radom on a two-and-a-half-year contract.

International career
Ramos represented Portugal at the 2015 FIFA U-20 World Cup. He played all the matches save one in New Zealand, helping his country reach the quarter-finals.

Ramos won his first cap for the under-21 side on 12 November 2015, featuring the second 45 minutes of the 4–0 victory against Albania in Arouca for the 2017 UEFA European Under-21 Championship qualifiers.

Career statistics

Honours
Porto B
LigaPro: 2015–16

References

External links

1995 births
Living people
People from Póvoa de Varzim
Sportspeople from Porto District
Portuguese footballers
Association football midfielders
Primeira Liga players
Liga Portugal 2 players

Varzim S.C. players
Padroense F.C. players
FC Porto B players
FC Porto players
Vitória S.C. players
C.D. Santa Clara players
C.D. Nacional players
Radomiak Radom players
Portugal youth international footballers
Portugal under-21 international footballers
Footballers at the 2016 Summer Olympics
Olympic footballers of Portugal
Portuguese expatriate footballers
Expatriate footballers in Poland
Portuguese expatriate sportspeople in Poland